Keith Allen Haring (May 4, 1958 – February 16, 1990) was an American artist whose pop art emerged from the New York City graffiti subculture of the 1980s. His animated imagery has "become a widely recognized visual language". Much of his work includes sexual allusions that turned into social activism by using the images to advocate for safe sex and AIDS awareness. In addition to solo gallery exhibitions, he participated in renowned national and international group shows such as documenta in Kassel, the Whitney Biennial in New York, the São Paulo Biennial, and the Venice Biennale. The Whitney Museum held a retrospective of his art in 1997.

Haring's popularity grew from his spontaneous drawings in New York City subways—chalk outlines of figures, dogs, and other stylized images on blank black advertising spaces. After gaining public recognition, he created colorful larger scale murals, many commissioned. He produced more than 50 public artworks between 1982 and 1989, many of them created voluntarily for hospitals, day care centers and schools. In 1986, he opened the Pop Shop as an extension of his work. His later work often conveyed political and societal themes—anti-crack, anti-apartheid, safe sex, homosexuality and AIDS—through his own iconography.

Haring died on February 16, 1990, of AIDS. In 2014, he was one of the inaugural honorees in the Rainbow Honor Walk in San Francisco, a walk of fame noting LGBTQ people who have "made significant contributions in their fields". In 2019, he was one of the inaugural 50 American "pioneers, trailblazers, and heroes" inducted on the National LGBTQ Wall of Honor within the Stonewall National Monument in New York City's Stonewall Inn.

Biography

Early life and education: 1958–1979 
Haring was born in Reading, Pennsylvania, on May 4, 1958. He was raised in Kutztown, Pennsylvania, by his mother, Joan Haring, and father, Allen Haring, an engineer and amateur cartoonist. He had three younger sisters, Kay, Karen and Kristen. He became interested in art at a very young age, spending time with his father producing creative drawings. His early influences included Walt Disney cartoons, Dr. Seuss, Charles Schulz, and the Looney Tunes characters in The Bugs Bunny Show.

Haring's family attended the United Church of Christ. In his early teenage years, he was involved with the Jesus Movement. He later hitchhiked across the country, selling T-shirts he made featuring the Grateful Dead and anti-Nixon designs. He graduated from Kutztown Area High School in 1976. He studied commercial art from 1976 to 1978 at Pittsburgh's Ivy School of Professional Art, but eventually lost interest, inspired to focus on his own art after reading The Art Spirit (1923) by Robert Henri.

Haring had a maintenance job at the Pittsburgh Center for the Arts and was able to explore the art of Jean Dubuffet, Jackson Pollock, and Mark Tobey. He was highly influenced around this time by a 1977 retrospective of Pierre Alechinsky's work and by a lecture that the sculptor Christo gave in 1978. From Alechinsky's work, he felt encouraged to create large images that featured writing and characters. From Christo, Haring was introduced to ways of incorporating the public into his art. His first significant one-man exhibition was in Pittsburgh at the Center for the Arts in 1978.

Haring moved to the Lower East Side of New York in 1978 to study painting at the School of Visual Arts. He also worked as a busboy during this time at the nightclub Danceteria. While attending school he studied semiotics with Bill Beckley and experimented with video and performance art. Haring was also highly influenced in his art by author William Burroughs.

In 1978, Haring wrote in his journal: "I am becoming much more aware of movement. The importance of movement is intensified when a painting becomes a performance. The performance (the act of painting) becomes as important as the resulting painting."

In December 2007, an area of the American Textile Building in the TriBeCa neighborhood of New York City was discovered to have a Haring painting from 1979.

Early work: 1980–1981 
Haring first received public attention with his graffiti art in subways, where he created white chalk drawings on black, unused advertisement backboards in the stations. He considered the subways to be his "laboratory", a place where he could experiment and create his artwork and saw the black advertisement paper as a free space and "the perfect place to draw". The Radiant Baby, a crawling infant with emitting rays of light, became his most recognized symbol. He used it as his tag to sign his work while a subway artist. Symbols and images (such as barking dogs, flying saucers, and large hearts) became common in his work and iconography. As a result, Haring's works spread quickly and he became exceedingly more recognizable.

The writings of Burroughs and Brion Gysin inspired Haring's work with lettering and words. In 1980, he created headlines from word juxtaposition and attached hundreds to lamp-posts around Manhattan. These included phrases like "Reagan Slain by Hero Cop" and "Pope Killed for Freed Hostage". That same year, as part of his participating in The Times Square Show with one of his earliest public projects, Haring altered a banner advertisement above a subway entrance in Times Square that showed a female embracing a male's legs, blacking-out the first letter so that it essentially read "hardón" instead of "Chardón", a French clothing brand. He later used other forms of commercial material to spread his work and messages. This included mass producing buttons and magnets to hand out and working on top of subway ads.

In 1980, Haring began organizing exhibitions at Club 57, which were filmed by his close friend and photographer Tseng Kwong Chi. In February 1981, Haring had his first solo exhibition at Westbeth Painters Space in the West Village. In November 1981, he had a solo show at Hal Bromm Gallery in Tribeca.

Breakthrough and rise to fame: 1982–1986 

In January 1982, Haring was the first of twelve artists organized by Public Art Fund to display work on the computer-animated Spectacolor billboard in Times Square. That summer, Haring created his first major outdoor mural on the Houston Bowery Wall on the Lower East Side. In his paintings, he often used lines to show energy and movement. Haring would often work quickly, trying to create as much work as possible—sometimes completing as many as 40 paintings in a day. One of his works, Untitled (1982), depicts two figures with a radiant heart-love motif, which critics have interpreted as a boldness in homosexual love and a significant cultural statement.

In 1982, Haring participated in documenta 7 in Kassel, where his work were exhibited alongside Joseph Beuys, Anselm Kiefer, Gerhard Richter, Cy Twombly, Jean-Michel Basquiat and Andy Warhol. In October 1982, he had an exhibition at the Tony Shafrazi Gallery with his collaborator graffiti artist Angel "LA II" Ortiz. That year, he was in several group exhibitions including Fast at the Alexander Milliken Gallery in New York.

In February 1983, Haring had a solo exhibition at the Fun Gallery in the East Village, Manhattan. That year, Haring participated in the São Paulo Biennale in Brazil and the Whitney Biennial in New York.  In April 1983, Haring was commissioned to paint a mural, Construction Fence, at the construction site of the Haggerty Museum of Art in Milwaukee. Later that year, Haring took part in the exhibition Urban Pulses: the Artist and the City in Pittsburgh by spray painting a room at the Pittsburgh Center for the Arts and creating an outdoor mural at PPG Place. In October 1983, Elio Fiorucci invited Haring to Milan to paint the walls of his Fiorucci store. While Haring was in London for the opening of his exhibition at the Robert Fraser Gallery in October 1983, he met and began collaborating with choreographer Bill T. Jones. Haring used Jones' body as the canvas to paint from head to toe. 

Haring and Angel "LA II" Ortiz produced a T-shirt design for friends Willi Smith and Laurie Mallet's clothing label WilliWear Productions in 1984. After Haring was profiled in Paper magazine, fashion designer Vivienne Westwood reached out to editor-in-chief Kim Hastreiter to facilitate a meeting with Haring. Haring presented Westwood with two large sheets of drawings and she turned them into textiles for her Autumn/Winter 1983-84 Witches collection. Haring's friend Madonna wore a skirt from the collection, most notably in the music video her 1984 single "Borderline."

As Haring rose to stardom he continued to draw in the subways, contrasting the rocketing prices for his work. Haring enjoyed giving his work away for free, often handing out free buttons and posters of his work. In 1984, he released a book titled Art in Transit, which featured photography by Tseng Kwong Chi and an introduction by Henry Geldzahler. Haring's swift rise to international celebrity status was covered by the media. His art covered the February 1984 issue of Vanity Fair, and he was featured in the October 1984 issue of Newsweek. 

In 1984, the New York City Department of Sanitation asked Haring to design a logo for their anti-litter campaign. Haring participated in the Venice Biennale. He was invited to create temporary murals at the National Gallery of Victoria and the Art Gallery of New South Wales. During his visit to Australia, he painted the permanent Keith Haring Mural at Collingwood Technical College in Melbourne. That year, Haring also painted murals at the Walker Art Center in Minneapolis and in Rio de Janeiro. Later that year, he designed the stage set for the production of Bill T. Jones and Arnie Zane's Secret Pastures at the Brooklyn Academy of Music.

Haring was commissioned by the United Nations to create a first day cover the United Nations stamp and an accompanying limited edition lithograph to commemorate 1985 as International Youth Year. He designed MTV set decorations and painted murals for various art institutions and nightclubs, such as the Palladium in Manhattan. In March 1985, Haring painted the walls of the Grande Halle de la Villette for the Biennale de Paris. In July 1985, he made a painting for the Live Aid concert at J.F.K. Stadium in Philadelphia. Additionally, he painted a car owned by art dealer Max Protetch to be auctioned with proceeds donated to African famine relief. Haring continued to be politically active as well by designing Free South Africa posters in 1985, and creating a poster for the 1986 Great Peace March for Global Nuclear Disarmament.

In the spring of 1986, Haring had his first solo museum exhibition at the Stedelijk Museum in Amsterdam, and he painted a mural. In 1986, Haring also created public murals in the lobby and ambulatory care department of Woodhull Medical and Mental Health Center on Flushing Avenue in Brooklyn.

In June 1986, Haring created a 90-foot banner, CityKids Speak on Liberty, in conjunction with The CityKids Foundation to commemorate the centennial anniversary of the Statue of Liberty's arrival in the United States. Later that month, he created his Crack is Wack mural in East Harlem, visible from New York's FDR Drive. It was originally considered as vandalism by the New York Police Department and Haring was arrested. But after local media outlets picked up the story, Haring was released on a lesser charge. While in jail, Haring's original work was vandalized. This mural is an example of Haring's use of consciousness raising rather than consumerism, "Crack is Wack" rather than "Coke is it." He painted an updated version of the mural on the same wall in October 1986.

On October 23, 1986, Haring created a mural on the Berlin Wall for the Checkpoint Charlie Museum. The colors were a representation of the German flag and symbolized the hope of unity between East and West Germany.

Haring began collaborating with Grace Jones, whom he had met through Andy Warhol, for an interview magazine shoot in 1984. Haring painted Jones' body for her music video "I'm Not Perfect" (1986) and live performances at the Paradise Garage. He also painted Jones' for her role of Katrina the Queen of The Vampires in the 1986 film Vamp. Haring collaborated with David Spada, a jewelry designer, to design the sculptural adornments for Jones.

Haring also illustrated vinyl covers for various artists such as David Bowie's "Without You" (1983), N.Y.C. Peech Boys' Life Is Something Special (1983), Malcolm McLaren's "Duck For The Oyster" (1983), and Sylvester's "Someone Like You" (1986).

Pop Shop: 1986 

In April 1986, Pop Shop opened in Soho, selling shirts, posters, and other items showing Haring's work. This made Haring's work readily accessible to purchase at reasonable prices. Having achieved what he wanted, which was "getting the work out to the public at large," Haring completely stopped drawing in the subways. He also stopped because people were taking the subway drawings and selling them.

Some criticized Haring for commercializing his work. Asked about this, Haring said, "I could earn more money if I just painted a few things and jacked up the price. My shop is an extension of what I was doing in the subway stations, breaking down the barriers between high and low art." The Pop Shop remained open after Haring's death till 2005; profits went to the Keith Haring Foundation.

The Pop Shop was far from Haring's only effort to make his work widely accessible. Throughout his career, Haring made art in subways and on billboards. His attempts to make his work relatable can also be seen in his figures' lack of discernable ages, races, or identities. By the arrival of Pop Shop, his work began reflecting more socio-political themes, such as anti-Apartheid, AIDS awareness, and the crack cocaine epidemic.

Final years and death: 1987–1990 
From 1982 to 1989, Haring was featured in more than 100 solo and group exhibitions and produced more than 50 public artworks in dozens of charities, hospitals, day care centers, and orphanages. Haring was openly gay and used his work to advocate for safe sex. He was diagnosed with AIDS in the autumn of 1988. He used his imagery during the last years of his life to speak about his illness and to generate activism and awareness about AIDS.

In 1987, Haring had exhibitions in Helsinki, Paris, and elsewhere. During his stay in Paris for the 10th anniversary exhibition of American artists at the Centre Georges Pompidou, Haring and his lover Juan Rivera painted the Tower mural on an  exterior stairwell at the Necker Children's Hospital. While in Belgium for his exhibition at Gallery 121, Haring painted a mural at the Museum of Contemporary Art, Antwerp.

That same year, Haring was also invited by artist Roger Nellens to paint a mural at his Casino Knokke. While working there, Haring stayed in Le Dragon, a monster-shaped guest house owned by Nellens which had been designed by artist Niki de Saint Phalle. With the consent of both the designer and the owner, Haring painted a fresco mural along an interior balcony and stairway.

Haring designed a carousel for André Heller's Luna Luna, an ephemeral amusement park in Hamburg from June to August 1987 with rides designed by renowned contemporary artists. In August 1987, Haring painted a large mural at the Carmine Street Recreation Center's outdoor pool in the West Village. In September 1987, he painted a temporary mural, Detroit Notes, at the Cranbrook Art Museum in Bloomfield Hills, Michigan. The work reveals a darker phase in Haring's style, which Cranbrook Art Museum Director Andrew Blauvelt speculates foreshadowed the confirmation of his AIDS diagnosis.

Haring designed the cover for the 1987 benefit album A Very Special Christmas and the Run-DMC single "Christmas In Hollis"; proceeds went to the Special Olympics. The image for the A Very Special Christmas compilation album consists of a typical Haring figure holding a baby. Its "Jesus iconography" is considered unusual in modern rock holiday albums.

Also in 1987, Haring painted a mural in the Philadelphia neighborhood of Point Breeze titled 'We the Youth' to commemorate the bicentennial of the United States Constitution. Originally intended as a placeholder, a new rowhome was never built and the lot became a park. The mural underwent a major restoration in 2013 and is Haring's longest standing public mural at its original location.

In 1988, Haring joined a select group of artists whose work has appeared on the label of Chateau Mouton Rothschild wine. In January 1988, he traveled to Japan to open Pop Shop Tokyo; it closed in the summer of 1988. In April 1988, Haring created a mural on the South Lawn for the annual White House Easter Egg Roll, which he donated to Children's National Hospital in Washington, D.C. Late in the summer, Haring traveled to Düsseldorf for a show of his paintings and sculptures at the Hans Mayer Gallery. In December 1988, Haring's exhibition opened at the Tony Shafrazi Gallery, which he stated was his most important show to date. He felt he had something to prove because of his health condition and the deaths of his friends Andy Warhol and Jean-Michel Basquiat.

In February 1989, Haring painted the Todos Juntos Podemos Parar el SIDA mural in the drug-infested Barrio Chino neighborhood of Barcelona to raise awareness of the AIDS epidemic. In May 1989, at the invitation of a teacher named Irving Zucker, Haring visited Chicago to paint a 480-foot mural in Grant Park along with nearly 500 students. Three other Haring murals materialized in Chicago around the same time: two at Rush University Medical Center, the other at Wells Community Academy High School. The latter, was completed days before Haring's arrival in Chicago, as a sort of welcome. According to Zucker, Haring sent the school a design template for the mural, which was executed by a fellow teacher, Tony Abboreno, an abstract artist, and Wells High School art students, but Haring gave it his final approval and signed it himself.

For The Center Show, an exhibition celebrating the 20th anniversary of the Stonewall Riots, Haring was invited by the Lesbian and Gay Community Services Center in New York to create a site-specific work. He chose the second-floor men's bathroom to paint his Once Upon a Time... mural in May 1989. In June 1989, Haring painted his Tuttomondo mural on the rear wall of the convent of the Sant'Antonio Abate church in Pisa.

Haring criticized the avoidance of social issues such as AIDS through a piece called Rebel with Many Causes (1989) that revolves around a theme of "hear no evil, see no evil, speak no evil". During the last week of November 1989, Haring painted a mural at the ArtCenter College of Design in Pasadena for "A Day Without Art". The mural was commemorated on December 1, the second annual AIDS Awareness Day. He commemorated the mural on December 1, World AIDS Day, and told the Los Angeles Times: "My life is my art, it's intertwined. When AIDS became a reality in terms of my life, it started becoming a subject in my paintings. The more it affected my life the more it affected my work." From Pasadena, Haring flew to Atlanta for the opening of his dual show with photographer Herb Ritts at the Fay Gold Gallery on December 2. In 1990, Haring painted a BMW Z1 at the Hans Mayer Gallery in Düsseldorf.  He traveled to Paris for what would be his last exhibition, Keith Haring 1983, at Galerie 1900-2000/La Galerie de Poche in January 1990.

On February 16, 1990, Haring died of AIDS-related complications at his LaGuardia Place apartment in Greenwich Village. He was cremated and his ashes were scattered in a field near Bowers, Pennsylvania, just south of his hometown of Kutztown. Three months after his death, Haring posthumously appeared in Rosa von Praunheim's documentary film Silence = Death (1990) about gay artists in New York City fighting for the rights of people with AIDS. It was released on May 4, which would have been his 32nd birthday.

Friendships 
Soon after moving to New York to study at the School of Visual Arts, he became friends with classmates Kenny Scharf, Samantha McEwen, and John Sex. Eventually, he befriended Jean-Michel Basquiat, who would write his SAMO graffiti around the campus. When Basquiat died in 1988, Haring wrote his obituary for Vogue magazine, and he paid homage to him with the painting A Pile of Crowns for Jean-Michel Basquiat (1988).

In 1979, Haring met photographer Tseng Kwong Chi in the East Village. They became friends and he documented much of Haring's career. In 1980, Haring met and began collaborating with graffiti artist Angel "LA II" Ortiz. Haring recounted: "We just immediately hit it off. It's as if we'd known each other all our lives. He's like my little brother." Ortiz's artistry formed an important part of Haring's work that has gone unacknowledged by the art establishment. Following Haring's death, Ortiz stopped receiving credit and payment for his part in Haring's work. According to Montez, author of the book Keith Haring's Line: Race and the Performance of Desire, the Keith Haring Foundation and the art world have since made strides to rectify Ortiz's erasure.

By the early 1980s, Haring had established friendships with fellow emerging artists Fab 5 Freddy and Futura 2000, and singer Madonna. Andy Warhol, who befriended Haring in 1982, was the theme of his 1986 Andy Mouse series. Warhol also created a portrait of Haring and his lover Juan Dubose in 1983. Through Warhol, Haring became friends with Grace Jones, Francesco Clemente, and Yoko Ono. He also formed friendships with George Condo, Jean-Charles de Castelbajac, and Claude Picasso.

Art dealer Yves Arman was Haring's close friend, and Haring was the godfather of his daughter. Haring said Arman was "probably the best supporter I had in the art world." In 1989, Arman was killed in a car accident on his way to see Haring in Spain.

In 1988, Gil Vazquez was invited by a friend to visit Haring's Broadway studio. Haring and Vazquez became close friends and spent a great deal of time together. Before his death, Haring set up a foundation bearing his name. He appointed his assistant and studio manager Julia Gruen to be the executive director; she began working for him in 1984. Vazquez is the board president of the foundation, which is based at Haring's Broadway studio.

Legacy

The Keith Haring Foundation
In 1989, Haring established the Keith Haring Foundation to provide funding and imagery to AIDS organizations and children's programs. The foundation's stated goal is to keep his wishes and expand his legacy by providing grants and funding to non-profit organizations that educate disadvantaged youths and inform the public about HIV and AIDS. It also shares his work and contains information about his life. The foundation also supports arts and educational institutions by funding exhibitions, educational programs, and publications. In 2010, The foundation partnered with the AIDS Service Center NYC to open the Keith Haring ASC Harlem Center to provide HIV peer education and access to care services in Harlem.

Accolades and tributes 
As a celebration of his life, Madonna declared that the final American date of her 1990 Blond Ambition World Tour would be a benefit concert for Haring's memory. The more than $300,000 the show made from ticket sales was donated to the Foundation for AIDS Research. The act was documented in the 1991 film Madonna: Truth or Dare.

Haring's work was featured in several of Red Hot Organization's efforts to raise money for AIDS and AIDS awareness, specifically its first two albums, Red Hot + Blue (1990) and Red Hot + Dance (1992), the latter of which used Haring's work on its cover. His art remains on display worldwide.

In 1991, Haring was commemorated on the AIDS Memorial Quilt with his famous baby icon on a fabric panel. The baby was embroidered by Haring's aunt, Jeannette Ebling, and Haring's mother, Joan Haring, did much of the sewing.

Tim Finn wrote the song "Hit The Ground Running", on his album Before & After (1993), in memory of Haring.

In 2006, Haring was named by Equality Forum as one of their 31 Icons of LGBT History Month.

In 2008, Haring had a balloon in tribute to him at the Macy's Thanksgiving Day Parade.

On May 4, 2012, on what would have been Haring's 54th birthday, Google honored him in a Google Doodle.

In 2014, Haring was one of the inaugural honorees in the Rainbow Honor Walk. The Rainbow Honor Walk is a walk of fame in San Francisco's Castro neighborhood noting LGBTQ people who have "made significant contributions in their fields."

In June 2019, Haring was one of the inaugural fifty American "pioneers, trailblazers, and heroes" inducted on the National LGBTQ Wall of Honor within the Stonewall National Monument (SNM) in New York City's Stonewall Inn. The SNM is the first U.S. national monument dedicated to LGBTQ rights and history, and the wall's unveiling was timed to take place during the 50th anniversary of the Stonewall riots.

In popular culture 

Haring's signature style is frequently seen in various fashion collections. His estate has collaborated with brands such as Adidas, Lacoste, UNIQLO, Supreme, Reebok, and Coach.

Haring is the subject of a composition, Haring at the Exhibition, written and performed by Italian composer Lorenzo Ferrero in collaboration with DJ Nicola Guiducci. The work combines excerpts from popular chart music of the 1980s with samples of classical music compositions by Lorenzo Ferrero and synthesized sounds. It was featured at "The Keith Haring Show", an exhibition which took place in 2005 at the Triennale di Milano.

In 2008, filmmaker Christina Clausen released the documentary The Universe of Keith Haring. In the film, Haring's legacy is "resurrected through colorful archival footage and remembered by friends and admirers such as artists Kenny Scharf and Yoko Ono, gallery owners Jeffrey Deitch and Tony Shafrazi, and choreographer Bill T. Jones".

Madonna used Haring's art as animated backdrops for her 2008/2009 Sticky and Sweet Tour. The animation featured his trademark blocky figures dancing in beat to an updated remix of "Into the Groove".

The puzzle uses 32 pieces of his work and weighs .

In 2017, his sister Kay Haring wrote a children's book, Keith Haring: The Boy Who Just Kept Drawing, which ranked among the top ten sellers every week for over a year in the Amazon category of Children's Art History.

In July 2020, BBC Two broadcast the documentary Keith Haring: Street Art Boy, which is built from a series of interviews between Haring and art critic John Gruen in 1989. The documentary, which was directed by Ben Anthony, aired in December 2020 on PBS as part of the American Masters series.

Influences
Haring's work demonstrates political and personal influences. References to his sexual orientation are apparent throughout his work, and his journals confirm its impact on his work. There are symbolic allusions to the AIDS epidemic in some of his later pieces, such as Untitled (cat. no. 27), Silence=Death and his sketch Weeping Woman. In some of his works—including cat. no. 27—the symbolism is subtle, but he also produced some blatantly activist works. Silence=Death, which mirrors the ACT UP poster and uses its motto, is almost universally agreed upon as a work of HIV/AIDS activism.

Haring was influenced by William Burroughs' work with Brion Gysin and their book The Third Mind. He was also influenced by fellow artists, including Andy Warhol, Jean-Michel Basquiat, George Condo, and Angel "LA II" Ortiz.In some of his art he drew connections between the end of the world and the AIDS virus. In a piece that he made with William Burroughs, he depicts the virus as demon-like creatures, the number 666, and a mushroom cloud.

Haring's proximity to the nuclear meltdown at Three Mile Island had a large impact on him. His fear of nuclear disaster started to appear in his art. An example of this is a black and white striped flag that he said symbolized the danger of a nuclear apocalypse.

Haring was deeply influenced by the Jesus Movement as a youth, and it continued to play a role in his art for his entire career. The movement was an extremely evangelical, loosely organized, diverse group of Christians. They were known for their anti-materialism and anti-establishment beliefs, focus on the Last Judgment, and their compassionate treatment of the poor. As a young teenager, Haring became very involved in the movement. Religious symbols started to be incorporated into his drawings around that age as well as Jesus Movement sentiments. This includes anti-church establishment views that can be seen in some of his later work. Though his time as a "Jesus Person" did not last beyond his teenage years, religious images, symbols, and references continued to appear in his art. In an interview near the end of his life he commented, "[All] that stuff stuck in my head and even now there are lots of religious images in my work. Some people even think my work is by a religious fanatic or maniac."

When Haring was drawing graffiti in the subway, he used a tag to sign his work. His tag, the Radiant Baby, depicts a baby with lines radiating from it, alluding to the Christ Child. He continued to make images depicting the Christ Child, including Nativity scenes in his characteristic style during his time as a subway artist. His last pieces were two religious triptychs; both went to Episcopal cathedrals. In them he illustrates the Last Judgment, though who is being saved in the pieces is ambiguous.

Exhibitions
During his lifetime, Haring had over 50 solo exhibitions, and was represented by well-known galleries such as the Tony Shafrazi Gallery and the Leo Castelli Gallery. Since his death, has been featured in over 150 exhibitions around the world. He has also been the subject of several international retrospectives.

Haring had his first solo exhibition at Westbeth Painters Space in February 1981. That month he also participated in New York/New Wave exhibit at MoMA PS1. Later that year he had a solo exhibition in the Hal Bromm Gallery, followed by his breakthrough exhibition at the Tony Shafrazi Gallery in 1982. That same year, he took part in documenta 7 in Kassel as well as Public Art Fund's Messages to the Public series in which he created work for a Spectacolor billboard in Times Square. In 1983, Haring contributed work to the Whitney Biennial and the São Paulo Biennial. He also had solo exhibitions at the Fun Gallery, Galerie Watari in Tokyo, and his second show the Tony Shafarzi Gallery.

In 1984, Haring participated in the group show Arte di Frontiera: New York Graffiti in Italy. He participated in the Venice Biennale in 1984 and 1986. In 1985, the CAPC in Bordeaux opened an exhibition of his works, and he took part in the Paris Biennial. In 1986, three of Haring's sculptures were placed at Dag Hammarskjöld Plaza outside the United Nations headquarters. Two of the works were displayed at Riverside Park from May 1988 to May 1989. In 1991–92, Haring's Figure Balancing on Dog was displayed in Dante Park in Manhattan.

In 1996, a retrospective at the Museum of Contemporary Art Australia was the first major exhibition of his work in Australia. His art was the subject of a 1997 retrospective at the Whitney Museum of American Art in New York, curated by Elisabeth Sussman. The Public Art Fund, in collaboration with the Estate of Keith Haring, organized a multi-site installation of his outdoor sculptures at Central Park's Doris C. Freedman Plaza and along the Park Avenue Malls. This public exhibition occurred simultaneously with the retrospective at the Whitney.

In 2007, Haring's painted aluminum sculpture Self-Portrait (1989) was displayed in the lobby of the Arsenal in Central Park, as part of the retrospective exhibition The Outdoor Gallery: 40 Years of Public Art in New York City Parks.

In 2008, there was a retrospective exhibition at the MAC in Lyon, France. In February 2010, on the occasion of the 20th anniversary of the Haring's death, the Tony Shafrazi Gallery showed an exhibition containing dozens of works from every stage of Haring's career. In March 2012, a retrospective exhibit of his work, Keith Haring: 1978–1982, opened at the Brooklyn Museum in New York. In April 2013, Keith Haring: The Political Line opened at the Musée d'Art Moderne de la Ville de Paris and Le Cent Quatre. In November 2014, then at the De Young Museum in San Francisco.

From December 2016 to June 2017, the Petersen Automotive Museum in Los Angeles exhibited The Unconventional Canvases of Keith Haring, which featured five vehicles that Haring painted. In 2019, Haring's work was exhibited at Gladstone Gallery in Belgium. The first major UK exhibition of Haring's work, featuring more than 85 artworks, was at Tate Liverpool from June to November 2019. From December 2019 to March 2020, the National Gallery of Victoria in Melbourne exhibited Keith Haring and Jean-Michel Basquiat: Crossing Lines.

In February 2021, the Museum of Contemporary Art Denver opened the exhibition Keith Haring: Grace House Mural, which displays 13 panels from a mural Haring painted at a Catholic youth center on the Upper West Side of Manhattan in either March 1983 or 1984. The mural—which featured Haring's radiant baby, barking dog, and dancing man figures—spanned three floors and 85 feet. When Grace House was sold, its operator, the Church of the Ascension, went against the Keith Haring Foundation's wishes of securing a buyer who would maintain the work. Instead, the church had sections of the mural cut out and sold at auction in 2019 to an anonymous private collector for $3.86 million. The panels are on loan to the museum and will appear on exhibit until August 22, 2021.

In March 2022, the exhibition Keith Haring: Grace House Mural moved to the Schunck Museum in Heerlen, Netherlands, where it will appear until September 25, 2022.

Art market 
A CBS Evening News report from October 1982 shows scenes from Haring's solo exhibit at the Tony Shafrazi Gallery in SoHo. It was reported that over a quarter of a million dollars worth of paintings were sold within the first few days of the show's opening. Although he was an established artist by 1983, Shafrazi stated that Haring wanted to keep his prices low. His prices ranged from $3,000 for a drawing to $15,000 for a large painting. By 1984, his works were selling for up to $20,000 and he had an annual income of $250,000.

Haring created the Pop Shop in 1986 in the SoHo district of Manhattan, selling T-shirts, toys, posters, and other objects that show his works—allowing his works to be accessible to a larger number of people. Speaking about the Pop Shop in 1989, Haring said: "For the past five or six years, the rewards I've gotten are very disproportionate to what I deserve...I make a lot more money than what I should make, so it's a little bit of guilt, of wanting to give it back."

Haring was represented until his death by art dealer Tony Shafrazi. Since his death in 1990, his estate has been administered by the Keith Haring Foundation, which is represented by Gladstone Gallery. In May 2017, Haring's painting Untitled (1982), which features his signature symbols—the radiant baby, barking dogs, angels and red Xs—sold for $6.5 million at Sotheby's in New York, becoming the most expensive Haring artwork sold at auction. However, the winning bidder, Anatole Shagalov, failed to pay and Sotheby's resold it for $4.4 million in August 2017.

In October 2020, the Keith Haring Foundation hired Sotheby's to hold an online auction of more than 140 works from Haring's collection. Dear Keith surpassed its estimate of $1.4 million to achieve $4.6 million with a 100 percent sell-through rate by lot. All proceeds from the sale went to the Lesbian, Gay, Bisexual & Transgender Community Center of New York. In December 2021, Haring's 1982 painting Untitled (Acrobats) from the collection of Peter M. Brant and Stephanie Seymour, sold for $5.5 million at Sotheby's in New York.

In 2022 the drawing of ''Radiant Baby'' that he had made on the wall of his childhood home in the early 1980s was removed by its owners, together with part of the wall panelling, and offered for sale.

Collections 
Haring's work is in major private and public collections, including the Museum of Modern Art, the Morgan Library and Museum, and the Whitney Museum of American Art in New York City; Los Angeles County Museum of Art; the Art Institute of Chicago; the Bass Museum in Miami; Musée d'Art Moderne de la Ville de Paris; the Brant Foundation Art Study Center in Greenwich, Connecticut; the Carnegie Museum of Art and the Andy Warhol Museum in Pittsburgh; the Ludwig Museum in Cologne; and the Stedelijk Museum in Amsterdam. He also created a wide variety of public works, including the infirmary at Children's Village in Dobbs Ferry, New York, and the second floor men's room in the Lesbian, Gay, Bisexual & Transgender Community Center in Manhattan, which was later transformed into an office and is known as the Keith Haring Room. In January 2019 an exhibit called "Keith Haring's New York" opened at New York Law School in the main building of its Tribeca campus.

The Nakamura Keith Haring Collection, established in 2007 in Hokuto, Yamanashi, Japan, is an art museum exhibiting exclusively the artworks of Haring.

Authentication issues
There is no catalogue raisonné for Haring, but there is copious information about him on the estate's website and elsewhere, enabling prospective buyers or sellers to research exhibition history. In 2012, the Keith Haring Foundation disbanded its authentication board to focus on its charitable activities. That same year, it donated $1 million to support exhibitions at the Whitney Museum of American Art and $1 million to Planned Parenthood of New York City's Project Street Beat. In 2014, a group of nine art collectors sued the foundation, claiming that it has cost them at least $40 million by refusing to authenticate 80 purported Haring works. In 2015, a judge ruled in favor of the foundation.

See also
 LGBT culture in New York City
 List of LGBTQ people from New York City

References

Bibliography

Further reading 
 Haring, Keith. Keith Haring Journals, Penguin Classics, 2010. 
Reading Public Museum, Keith Haring: Journey of the Radiant Baby, Piermont, New Hampshire : Bunker Hill Publishing Co., 2006. 
 Van Pee, Yasmine. Boredom is always counterrevolutionary: art in downtown New York nightclubs, 1978–1985 (M.A. thesis, Center for Curatorial Studies at Bard College, 2004)

External links

 Profile at the Keith Haring Foundation
 Keith Haring in Melbourne

Keith Haring
1958 births
1990 deaths
20th-century American painters
20th-century American printmakers
20th-century American male artists
AIDS-related deaths in New York (state)
American graffiti artists
American male painters
American gay artists
LGBT people from Pennsylvania
Painters from Pennsylvania
People from Kutztown, Pennsylvania
American pop artists
People from the Lower East Side
20th-century American businesspeople
American contemporary painters
Street artists
American muralists
American social activists
People from Greenwich Village
20th-century American LGBT people
American LGBT businesspeople
American LGBT photographers
American LGBT writers
LGBT photographers